Olan or OLAN may refer to:
Olan (mountain), a mountain in the Massif des Écrins in the French Alps (3564 m)
Olan (dish), a dish that is part of the Kerala cuisine of South India
Olan Mills Portrait Studios, Olan Studios (photographic)
Saint Olan (or Olann), patron Saint of the Parish of Aghabullogue in Ireland
Olan Montgomery (1963–2020), American pop-artist
Olan Soule (1909–1994), American character actor
One Letter Aerobatic Notation, OLAN is free software for the design, drawing and viewing of aerobatic sequences; related to the Aresti Catalog Standards document